Madge Kirby (born Madge Whitehead; April 12, 1884 – July 11, 1956) was an actress in silent film comedies. She co-starred in Dunces and Dangers and had roles in D.W. Griffith films. She also starred opposite Hank Mann in various comedies.

Kirby immigrated with her family to the U.S. from London in 1894. Her maiden name was Whitehead. She often wore a blonde wig on screen. She began acting on stage at age 14, becoming an ingenue. She later performed in vaudeville. She acted in films for Biograph Studio, American Film Company, and Fox Film Corporation.

Kirby died July 11, 1956.

Filmography
My Baby (film) (1912)
Heredity (film) (1912), as an American Indian mother
The New York Hat (1912)
The Painted Lady (1912)
Brutality (film) (1912)
The Burglar's Dilemma (1912)
The One She Loved (1912)
The Musketeers of Pig Alley (1912)
The Telephone Girl and the Lady (1913)
Soapsuds and Sapheads (1913)
Bears and Bad Men (1918)
Huns and Hyphens (1918)
Frauds and Frenzies (1918)
 The Flash of Fate (1918)
Dunces and Dangers (1918)
Skids and Scalawags (1918)
J-U-N-K (1920)

References

1884 births
1956 deaths
American stage actresses
American film actresses
American silent film actresses
Silent film comedians
Vaudeville performers
20th-century American actresses
Actresses from London
20th-century American comedians
20th-century English women
20th-century English people